Fue Lee (born 1991) is an American politician serving in the Minnesota House of Representatives since 2016. A member of the Minnesota Democratic-Farmer-Labor Party (DFL), Lee represents District 59A, which includes parts of northern Minneapolis in Hennepin County, Minnesota. Lee is the first person of color and of Asian descent to represent his district.

Early life and education
Lee was born in a refugee camp in Thailand to Hmong parents from Laos, and came to Minneapolis as a toddler in 1992. He is a graduate of Carleton College, and was an employee in the office of the Minnesota Secretary of State. He co-founded the Asian American Organizing Project and Progressive Hmong American Organizers with former state Senator Mee Moua, DFL activist Yee Chang, and state Representative Jay Xiong; and has previously worked under then-Representative Steve Simon, Representative John Lesch, and then-U.S Representative Keith Ellison.

Minnesota House of Representatives
Lee was first elected to the Minnesota House of Representatives in 2016, after defeating incumbent Joe Mullery in a DFL primary, and has been reelected every two years since.

Community leaders encouraged Lee to run into the primaries after losing the DFL endorsement during the first round of voting by one delegate. According to Lee, "One of the reasons I decided to run for office is because candidates that were supposed to represent all of the city and its communities weren’t doing their job. I want to be able to respect my community by understanding the issues we’re facing on a daily basis."

From 2019-2020, Lee served as an assistant majority leader for the House DFL Caucus. Since 2021, Lee has served as chair of the Capital Investment Committee. He also sits on the Environment and Natural Resources Finance and Policy and Legacy Finance Committees.

Electoral history

References

External links
Neighbors for Fue Lee
Representative Fue Lee (DFL) District: 59A

1991 births
Living people
American politicians of Hmong descent
Politicians from Minneapolis
21st-century American politicians
Carleton College alumni
Thai emigrants to the United States
Hmong activists
Asian-American people in Minnesota politics
Democratic Party members of the Minnesota House of Representatives